Zakamensky District (Zakhaaminai aimag) is an administrative and municipal district (raion), one of the twenty-one in the Republic of Buryatia, Russia. It is located in the southwest of the republic. Its administrative center is the town of Zakamensk. As of the 2010 Census, the total population of the district was 28,453, with the population of Zakamensk accounting for 40.5% of that number.

Administrative and municipal status
Within the framework of administrative divisions, Zakamensky District is one of the twenty-one in the Republic of Buryatia. It is divided into one town (an administrative division with the administrative center in the town (an inhabited locality) of Zakamensk), five selsoviets, and eighteen somons, which comprise twenty-six rural localities. As a municipal division, the district is incorporated as Zakamensky Municipal District. The Town of Zakamensk and Kholtosonsky Selsoviet are incorporated as Zakamensk Urban Settlement, while the remaining four selsoviets and eighteen somons are incorporated into twenty-two rural settlements within the municipal district. The town of Zakamensk serves as the administrative center of both the administrative and municipal district.

History of the municipal divisions
Kholtosonsky Selsoviet used to be municipally incorporated as Kholtosonskoye Rural Settlement, but the latter was merged into Zakamensk Urban Settlement on July 18, 2015.

See also
Mele (Buryatia)

References

Notes

Sources

Districts of Buryatia
 
